Kajal Nishad (born 1 June 1982) is an Indian actress working in Bhojpuri cinema and Hindi Television and politician. She has acted in a number of TV series and Bhojpuri films, though is best known for her character Chameli in the SAB TV comedy soap Lapataganj (2009-2010) and Bhojpuri film Shaadi Biyah. She contested the 2012 Uttar Pradesh state assembly election from Gorakhpur (Rural) constituency on an Indian National Congress (INC) ticket. She was engaged in another of the channel's serial, Tota Weds Maina, where she portrayed the role of Ram Katori Chachi. She also played the role of Kanak Tripathi in Colors TV's Ishq Ka Rang Safed.

Personal life
Born in Mumbai, her parents are from Kutch Gujarat and settled in Mumbai. She is married to Bhojpuri film producer Sanjay Nishad, who is from the Bhauapaar village in Gorakhpur district.

Political career
She is member of Indian National Congress Party in Gorakhpur (Rural) as an youth-wing Indian Youth Congress candidate, wherein she finished at fourth place.

Controversy
In the lead up the state election, while campaigning in Kakrakhor, on the night 4 February 2012 she and her supporters was beaten up allegedly by supporters of BSP candidate. Subsequently, local police registered an FIR against BSP candidate Ram Bhuwal Nishad and his supporters under IPC sections "324, 147 (rioting), 323(voluntarily causing hurt) and 504 (intentional insult with intent to provoke breach of the peace)".

See also
 List of Bhojpuri cinema actresses

References

1982 births
Indian film actresses
Living people
Politicians from Mumbai
21st-century Indian actresses
Actresses in Bhojpuri cinema
Indian television actresses
Indian National Congress politicians
Women in Maharashtra politics
Actresses from Mumbai
Indian actor-politicians
Marathi politicians
Maharashtra politicians
21st-century Indian women politicians
21st-century Indian politicians
Samajwadi Party politicians